

Offseason 
 Prior to 1942 season: Grant Dunlap was acquired by the Indians from the Cincinnati Reds.

Regular season

Season standings

Record vs. opponents

Roster

Player stats

Batting

Starters by position 
Note: Pos = Position; G = Games played; AB = At bats; H = Hits; Avg. = Batting average; HR = Home runs; RBI = Runs batted in

Other batters 
Note: G = Games played; AB = At bats; H = Hits; Avg. = Batting average; HR = Home runs; RBI = Runs batted in

Pitching

Starting pitchers 
Note: G = Games pitched; IP = Innings pitched; W = Wins; L = Losses; ERA = Earned run average; SO = Strikeouts

Other pitchers 
Note: G = Games pitched; IP = Innings pitched; W = Wins; L = Losses; ERA = Earned run average; SO = Strikeouts

Relief pitchers 
Note: G = Games pitched; W = Wins; L = Losses; SV = Saves; ERA = Earned run average; SO = Strikeouts

Awards and honors 

All-Star Game

Jim Bagby, Pitcher

Lou Boudreau, Shortstop (starter)

Ken Keltner, Third baseman (starter)

Farm system 

LEAGUE CHAMPIONS: Cedar Rapids, Thomasville

References

External links
1942 Cleveland Indians at Baseball Reference
1942 Cleveland Indians at Baseball Almanac

Cleveland Indians seasons
Cleveland Indians season
Cleveland Indians